Anopina asuturana is a moth of the family Tortricidae. It is found in Nuevo Leon, Mexico.

References

Moths described in 2000
asuturana
Moths of Central America